A list of horror films released in 1963.

References

Notes

Bibliography

External links
 Most Popular Horror Feature Films Released In 1963 at the Internet Movie Database

Lists of horror films by year